Berehove is a village in Ukraine, Odesa Raion, in Odesa Oblast. It belongs to Usatove rural hromada, one of the hromadas of Ukraine, and is one of the 15 villages in the hromada. It has a population of about 45 (As of the Ukrainian 2001 Population Census).  It has 2 other names that can you can call Berehove:Beregove and Beregovoye.

Until 18 July 2020, Berehove belonged to Biliaivka Raion. The raion was abolished in July 2020 as part of the administrative reform of Ukraine, which reduced the number of raions of Odesa Oblast to seven. The area of Biliaivka Raion was merged into Odesa Raion.

Population census
As of January 12, 1989, Berehove had a population of 43 people. 

On December 5, 2001, Berehove had a population of 36 people (7 fewer people than 1989).

See also 
Chobotarivka

References

Villages in Odesa Raion
Usatove Hromada